Ivaylo Ivanikov (born 17 May 1971) is a Bulgarian former football goalkeeper

External links

1971 births
Living people
Bulgarian footballers
First Professional Football League (Bulgaria) players
OFC Pirin Blagoevgrad players
PFC Pirin Blagoevgrad players
PFC Belasitsa Petrich players
Association football goalkeepers